Horný Hričov is a village and municipality in Žilina District in the Žilina Region of northern Slovakia.

History
In historical records the village was first mentioned in 1208.

Geography
The municipality lies at an altitude of 318 metres and covers an area of 5.782 km2. It has a population of about 780 people.

Genealogical resources

The records for genealogical research are available at the state archive "Statny Archiv in Bytca, Slovakia"

 Roman Catholic church records (births/marriages/deaths): 1690-1952 (parish B)

See also
 List of municipalities and towns in Slovakia

External links

https://web.archive.org/web/20070513023228/http://www.statistics.sk/mosmis/eng/run.html
Surnames of living people in Horny Hricov

Villages and municipalities in Žilina District